Council Hill is a town in Muskogee County, Oklahoma, United States. The population was 158 at the 2010 census, an increase of 28.5 percent over the figure of 129 recorded in 2000.

History
Council Hill began as a council house for the Creek Nation circa 1840, after the tribe had been forced to emigrate to Indian Territory. The Creeks named this location as Weklwa Hulwe or "High Spring," and consider it their first capitol. Smoke signals from the top of the hill announced calls for general council meetings to other Creek towns in the vicinity. After the outbreak of the Civil War, this place became the headquarters of the Creek Regiment of the Confederate Army, led by D. N. McIntosh.

After the Civil War, Council Hill became a simple farm community. The first post office was established in 1905. The Missouri, Oklahoma and Gulf Railroad (later the Kansas, Oklahoma and Gulf Railway) opened a line through the town in 1907 that enabled shipment of livestock and farm products to markets in the north and east. Cotton was the main crop, but other products included corn, potatoes, wheat, and oats. Oklahoma Pipeline Company built a pumping station at Council Hill for its line that carried crude oil from the Glenn Pool Oil Reserve to the Gulf Coast.

Geography
Council Hill is located at  (35.555141, -95.652076).

Demographics

As of the census of 2000, there were 129 people, 48 households, and 36 families residing in the town. There were 52 housing units at an average density of 164.7 per square mile (62.7/km2). The racial makeup of the town was 79.07% White, 2.33% African American, 12.40% Native American, and 6.20% from two or more races.

There were 48 households, out of which 20.8% had children under the age of 18 living with them, 64.6% were married couples living together, 10.4% had a female householder with no husband present, and 25.0% were non-families. 25.0% of all households were made up of individuals, and 10.4% had someone living alone who was 65 years of age or older. The average household size was 2.69 and the average family size was 3.22.

In the town, the population was spread out, with 29.5% under the age of 18, 6.2% from 18 to 24, 20.9% from 25 to 44, 20.2% from 45 to 64, and 23.3% who were 65 years of age or older. The median age was 40 years. For every 100 females, there were 111.5 males. For every 100 females age 18 and over, there were 97.8 males.

The median income for a household in the town was $20,500, and the median income for a family was $21,875. Males had a median income of $37,917 versus $37,500 for females. The per capita income for the town was $9,018. There were 20.5% of families and 30.1% of the population living below the poverty line, including 47.1% of under eighteens and 35.1% of those over 64.

References

External links
 Encyclopedia of Oklahoma History and Culture - Council Hill

Towns in Muskogee County, Oklahoma
Towns in Oklahoma